This is a list of publishers of works in Romanian.

A
 Editura Academiei
 Editura Adevărul
 Editura Albatros
 Editura Aldine
 Editura ALFA
 Editura ALL
 Grupul Editorial AMALTEA
 Amco Press
 Editura Anastasia
 Editura Antim Ivireanul
 Editura Aquila '93
 Editura Art
 Editura Arta Grafică
 Editura Artemis

B
 Editura Bunavestire

C
 Editura C. H. Beck
 Editura Cartea Aromână
 Cartea Creștină
 Editura Cartea de Buzunar
 Cartea Românească
 Editura Cartea Românească Educațional
 Editura Cartea Rusă
 Cartea Universitară
 Editura Cartier
 Editura Casa Radio
 Editura Casa Şcoalelor
 cIMeC – Institutul de Memorie Culturală
 Editura Naţională Ciornei
 Editura Christiana
 Editura Compania
 Editura Contrafort
 Editura Corint
 Crime Scene Press
 Editura Cugetarea
 Editura Cultura Naţională
 Editura Curtea Veche
 Editura Cuvântul

D
 Editura Dacia
 Editura Danubius
 Editura Didactică şi Pedagogică

E
 Editura Economică
 Editura EFES
 Editura Eikon
 Editura Eminescu
 Editura Evenimentul Românesc
 Egmont România

F
 Editura Facla
 Editura Folium
 Fraţii Şaraga
 Editura Fundaţiei Culturale Române
 Editura Fundaţiei România de Mâine
 Editura Fundaţiilor Regale

G
 Editura Garamond

H
 Editura Hasefer
 Editura Hecate
 Humanitas
 Editura Hyperion

I
 Editura Idea
 Institutul de Arte Grafice Carol Gobl
 Institutul European
 Institutul Samitca
 Editura Ion Creangă

J
 Editura Junimea

K
 Editura Kriterion

L
 Editura de stat pentru literatură şi artă
 Editura Librăriei Leon Alcaly
 Editura Limes
 Editura Litera
 Editura Litera International
 Editura LiterNet
 Editura pentru literatură
 Editura pentru literatură universală

M
 Editura Medicală
 Editura Meridiane
 Editura Militară
 Editura Moldova
 Monitorul Oficial
Editura Mysterio

N
 Editura Nemira
 Editura Niculescu

P
 Editura Paideia
 Editura Paralela 45
 Polirom
 Editura Politehnica
 Editura Politehnium
 Editura Politică
 Editura Pontica
 Editura Prior & Books
 Editura Prometeu
 Editura Prut Internaţional

R
 RAO Publishing
 ROMPRES
 Editura Roza Vânturilor

S
 Editura Saeculum I.O.
 Editura Saga
 Editura Scrisul Românesc
 Editura Sigma
 Editura Sitech
 Editura Socec
 Editura Sport-Turism

Ş
 Editura Ştiinţifică şi Enciclopedică

T
 Editura Tehnică
 Editura Teora
 Editura Tineretului

U
 Editura Uniunii Scriitorilor
 Editura Univers
 Editura Univers Enciclopedic
 Editura Universităţii Al. I. Cuza
 Editura Universităţii Lucian Blaga
 Editura Universităţii din București

V
 Editura de Vest
 Editura Vinea
 Editura Vitruviu
 Editura Vremea

Z
 Editura Ziua

 
Lists of book publishing companies
Publishers, List of Romanian-language

Publishers, Romanian-language
Publishers